Trapelus schmitzi, also known as Schmitz' agama, is a species of agama. It is found in Chad and Algeria. It is named after , German herpetologist.

References

Trapelus
Lizards of Africa
Reptiles of North Africa
Reptiles described in 2006
Taxa named by Wolfgang Böhme (herpetologist)
Taxa named by Philipp Wagner